Acronicta psorallina is a moth of the family Noctuidae. It is found in Queensland.

The wingspan is about 30 mm.

External links
Australian Faunal Directory
Australian Caterpillars

Acronicta
Moths of Australia
Moths described in 1903